Ross Batty (born 20 September 1986, in England) a former Barnard Castle School pupil, is an English rugby union player whose primary position is hooker. Batty is currently at Bath in Premiership Rugby. 

A regular in the scrum for Bath after joining from Rotherham in 2010. Batty celebrated his 150th appearance for the Somerset side, on the 2nd of February 2018. The record takes into account cup matches. 

On 25 April 2019 Batty renewed his contract with Bath. The Bath regular agreed on an 'undisclosed-length' contract. With the club he had spent nine seasons with, at the end of the 2018-2019 season.
 He will retire on medical grounds at the end of the 2020–21 season.

References

External links
Guinness Premiership Profile

1986 births
Bath Rugby players
English rugby union players
Living people
Newcastle Falcons players
People educated at Barnard Castle School
Rotherham Titans players
Rugby union hookers
Rugby union players from Tyne and Wear